Mecyclothorax subunctus is a species of ground beetle in the subfamily Psydrinae. It was described by Perkins in 1917.

References

subunctus
Beetles described in 1917